The 1971–72 Copa del Generalísimo was the 70th staging of the Spanish Cup. The competition began on 24 October 1971 and concluded on 8 July 1972 with the final.

First round

Second round

Third round

|}
Bye: Cádiz CF and CD San Andrés.

Fourth round

|}

Fifth round

|}
Bye: UD Las Palmas

Round of 16

|}

Quarter-finals

|}

Semi-finals

|}

Final

|}

References

External links
 rsssf.com
 linguasport.com

Copa del Rey seasons
Copa del Rey
Copa